Ferdinand Marani (8 August 1893 – 18 July 1971) was a Canadian architect. His work was part of the architecture event in the art competition at the 1948 Summer Olympics. Marani attended Ridley College in St. Catharines, Ontario from 1901 to 1911. Then he went to study architecture at the University of Toronto, but he left it in 1914.

References

1893 births
1971 deaths
20th-century Canadian architects
Olympic competitors in art competitions
People from Vancouver